Lucoli is a comune (municipality) and town in the province of L'Aquila in the Abruzzo region of Italy. It is one of the nearest communes to the Campo Felice plain and ski resort.

The epicentre of 2009 L'Aquila earthquake was located near the communal north-eastern border.

References

Cities and towns in Abruzzo